Bareback is the first album by the American rock band Wild Horses.

Shortly before the recording of this album, former Shout lead vocalist John Levesque replaced original Wild Horses lead vocalist Johnny Edwards, who left Wild Horses to replace Lou Gramm in the band Foreigner.

Apparently, this band split up after the release of this album and reunited years later before recording and releasing their second album Dead Ahead.

There have been claims that bassist Jeff Pilson actually played all of the bass on this album.

Jeff Pilson and James Kottak had previously played together in Michael Lee Firkins's backing band and later played together in the McAuley Schenker Group.

Track listing
 "Cool Me Down"
 "Had Enough Of Your Love"
 "Your Love Is Junk"
 "The River Song"
 "Fire And Water"
 "N.Y.C. Heartbreak"
 "Whiskey Train"
 "Tougher Than Love"
 "Day In The Sun"
 "Matter Of The Heart"
 "Burn It Up"
 "Tell Me Something Good"

Personnel
John Levesque: lead vocals, guitars
Rick Steier: lead guitar, vocals
Chris Lester: bass, vocals
James Kottak: drums, vocals

Additional Personnel
Jeff Pilson: bass
Darren Wharton: keyboards

External links
 

Wild Horses (American rock band) albums